The University of Dental Medicine, Yangon, is the leading university of dental medicine, located in Yangon, Myanmar. The university, along with the University of Dental Medicine, Mandalay, is only one of two universities of dental medicine in the country. The annual intake into both dental universities is 300 but from 2017 it introduced the new intake and decrease to only 100 per university per year. The country with a population of over 50 million had only about 1500 dentists in 2005.

History
The dental school's origins trace back to the Faculty of Medicine of Rangoon University. In 1964, the College of Dental Medicine became independent per the University Act of 1964, and was located near the Lanmadaw campus of then Institute of Medicine 1. The college turned out 50 to 60 dental doctors with Bachelor of Dental Surgery (BDS) degrees. In 1974, the college was upgraded into the Institute of Dental Medicine. Until 1998, when the Institute of Dental Medicine, Mandalay was opened, it was only institution of dental medicine in the country.

Programs
The university offers bachelor's (BDS), master's (MDSc), and doctorate (DrDSc) programs as well as graduate diplomas in dental science (DipDSc) and dental technology (DDT).
The first Ph.D. program of Oral Biological Science was opened in 2011.

Coursework
The B.D.S. coursework extends six years.

Subjects

First B.D.S.
Myanmar
English
Mathematics and Statistics
Physics
Chemistry
Botany
Zoology

Second B.D.S.
Anatomy
Physiology
Biochemistry
Oral Biological Science

Third B.D.S.
Pathology
Microbiology
Pharmacology
Conservative Dentistry (Junior Operative Course)
Prosthodontics (Dental Material Science and Basic Prosthodontics)

Fourth B.D.S. Part I
General Medicine
General Surgery
Clinical Dentistry I (Oral Surgery and Oral Medicine)
Clinical Dentistry II (Periodontology, PCD, PSM)
Clinical Dentistry III (Pediatric Dentistry and Orthodontics)
Conservative Dentistry
Prosthodontics

Final B.D.S. Part II
Oral Medicine
Oral and Maxillofacial Surgery
Orthodontics
Paedodontics
Prosthodontics
Conservative Dentistry
Preventive and Community Dentistry
Periodontology

House Surgeon Training
All students, after a successful completion of Final  B.D.S. Examination, continue on to hands-on training for a period of 5 months as house surgeons in the recognized teaching hospitals.
Only after the completion of house-surgeonship, is the student awarded the B.D.S. degree.

Leadership
The University of Dental Medicine, Yangon has been headed by an academic dean known as a rector.
Aung Than (1964–1983)
Khin Maung Lay (1983–1992)
Htay Saung (1993–1995)
Myint Naing (1995–1997)
Paing Soe (1997–2003)
Ba Myint (2004–2007)
Myo Win (2008–2012)
Thein Kyu (2012–2015)
Shwe Toe (2015–present)

Alumni
 Thein Kyu
 Zarganar
 Zayar Thaw
 Han Htue Lwin (Big Bag)

References

External links
 Myanmar Dental Association
 International College of Dentists, Section XIV Myanmar
 International Association for Dental Research

Universities and colleges in Yangon
Medical schools in Myanmar
Universities and colleges in Myanmar
Educational institutions established in 1964
1964 establishments in Burma